Vitalijus Karpačiauskas (born 6 July 1966) is a Lithuanian boxer. He competed at the 1992 Summer Olympics and the 1996 Summer Olympics.

References

1966 births
Living people
Lithuanian male boxers
Olympic boxers of Lithuania
Boxers at the 1992 Summer Olympics
Boxers at the 1996 Summer Olympics
Sportspeople from Panevėžys
AIBA World Boxing Championships medalists
Welterweight boxers